Deon is a given name.

People with the name include:

 Deon Burton (born 1976), English-born Jamaican footballer
 Deon Butler (born 1986), American football player
 Deon Cain (born 1996), American football player
 Deon Hemmings (born 1968), Jamaican female 400 metres hurdler
 Deon Jackson (1946–2014), African-American singer
 Deon Kruis (born 1974), South African cricketer
 Deon Lacey (born 1990), American football player
 Deon Lee (born 1982), South Korean born composer
 Deon Lendore (born 1992), Trinidadian sprinter
 Deon Miles, American chemist 
Deon Strother, American football player
 Deon Thomas (born 1971), American-Israeli basketball player
 Deon van der Walt (1958–2005), South Afrikan operatic tenor
 Deon Yelder (born 1995), American football player
Deon Temne (1972), Sierra Leonean-American, Afrocentrism, human rights activist
 Deon Chrisman (born 2007), American Singer
 Deon Wilson, protagonist in Chappie (film)

See also 
 
 d'Eon, a surname
 Deion, given name
 Dion (disambiguation), includes a list of people with given name Dion
 Dione (disambiguation), includes a list of people with given name Dione
 Dionne (name), given name and surname